The 2008 Italian Formula Three Championship was the 44th Italian Formula Three Championship season. It began on May 10 at Mugello and ended on October 19 at Vallelunga after 16 races.

The season began with Edoardo Piscopo dominating the field with four successive wins, but another run of seven victories by Mirko Bortolotti, gave him the leadership in the championship. The championship title was delayed to the last round in Vallelunga, the victory in race one and his eighth of the season gave Bortolotti the championship crown.

The three first classified drivers of the championship were rewarded with a Formula One test organized by the Scuderia Ferrari at the wheel of a Ferrari F2008 at Fiorano, with Bortolotti setting the new track record.

Teams and drivers
 All cars were powered by FPT engines, all teams were Italian-registered.
{|
|

Calendar
All rounds were held in Italy.

Standings
Points are awarded as follows:

References

External links
 Official website

Italian Formula Three Championship seasons
Formula Three
Italian
Italian Formula 3 Championship